John Evans (23 September 1897 – 20 March 1940) was a Welsh professional rugby league footballer who played in the 1920s.

Playing career

Swinton
Evans played  in Swinton's 0–17 defeat by St Helens Recs in the 1923 Lancashire County Cup Final during the 1923–24 season at Central Park, Wigan on Saturday 24 November 1923, played left-, and scored a try in the 15–11 victory over Wigan in the 1925 Lancashire County Cup Final during the 1925–26 season at The Cliff, Broughton, Salford on Wednesday 9 December 1925 (postponed from Saturday 21 November 1925 due to fog), and played left- in the 5–2 victory over Wigan in the 1927 Lancashire County Cup Final during the 1927–28 season at Watersheddings, Oldham on Saturday 19 November 1927.

International honours
Evans won caps for England while at Swinton in 1925 against Wales (2 matches), in 1926 against Wales, and Other Nationalities, in 1928 against Wales, and won caps for Great Britain while at Swinton in 1926–27 against New Zealand (3 matches).

Coaching career
Evans was appointed as manager of Broughton Rangers ahead of the 1933–34 season. In February 1934, he made an appearance for the Rangers as a player against Castleford, but suffered a collarbone injury early in the game, and took no further part.

Genealogical information
Jack Evans was the older brother of the rugby league footballer; Bryn Evans.

Outside of rugby league

Jack Evans was the landlord of the Royal Oak, 536 Bolton Road, Pendlebury from 1932 onwards and probably until his untimely death in 1940. In later years the pub was run by his son Stan who was also assisted by Jack's brother Bryn, Stan's uncle.

References

External links

1897 births
1940 deaths
British publicans
Broughton Rangers coaches
Broughton Rangers players
England national rugby league team players
Great Britain national rugby league team players
Rugby league centres
Rugby league players from Rhondda Cynon Taf
Swinton Lions players
Welsh rugby league coaches
Welsh rugby league players